

Legend

List

References

2004-05